Zenus Bank is an American digital bank headquartered in San Juan. Founded in 2019 by Mushegh Tovmasyan, the company operates with an international banking licence offering Personal, Business, Corporate and Institutional banking services direct to clients through mobile apps and online banking. This approach enables clients to remotely open accounts without the need to be a US citizen, resident or registered business. It currently services customers in over 90 countries.

The bank is a Principal Member of Visa and offers customers current accounts, virtual and physical debit cards, free international payment transfers, domestic ACH and international wire transfers in over 40 currencies. A member of the Society for Worldwide Interbank Financial Telecommunications (SWIFT), Zenus Bank operates a full reserve banking model without lending or credit activities, offering an international alternative to local banks.

History 
Zenus was founded in Puerto Rico in 2019 by Mushegh Tovmasyan, formerly the founder and Group Chief Executive Officer of Divisa Capital and the online trader Equiti Group. He also founded the management consulting firm FXFY in Puerto Rico.

The Bank, which officially launched its services in October 2021, was established with the aim of allowing individuals and businesses in developing countries to apply for a US bank account and debit card remotely, without needing to be a US citizen or resident, to help provide day-to-day banking services globally.

In 2021, Zenus became an official signatory of the UN Principles for Responsible Banking – the leading framework for a sustainable banking industry – committing to aligning the banking sector with the objective of the UN Sustainable Development Goals and the 2015 Paris Climate Agreement.

In May 2022, Zenus announced a partnership with Microsoft to expand its innovative digital bank into a pioneer infrastructure bank, set to transform international banking. Banking and Financial services are highly regulated industries and Microsoft's cloud, Azure, allows digital banks like Zenus Bank to securely develop and scale their operations to grow without compromise.

Fundraising 
In 2019, Zenus closed an undisclosed pre-seed funding round from financers, including the investment firm, Three Thousand Capital.

Services 
Zenus offers personal accounts, debit cards, free international payment transfers, International FX rates and limitless domestic ACH and international wire transfers in over 150 countries in partnership with Microsoft. The company's mobile app offers customers the ability to open a US bank account online, from over 150 countries, in under 10 minutes, without the need to be a US citizen or resident.

In 2019, the company enlisted NICE to establish a cloud-focused financial crime strategy for both anti-money laundering compliance and enterprise fraud protections with its AML and Fraud SaaS Essentials solutions.

In October 2022, Zenus signed an exclusive partnership with Finxact, a Fiserv company and provider of the leading next-gen core banking platform to the US and global banking sector.

Mobile Apps 
Zenus has released its mobile app for both iOS and Android phones across all four continents. Payments made with the Zenus cards will trigger push notifications in real-time to phones running the apps, where historical transactions can also be viewed.

Users can categorise their transactions, freeze the card (if lost), and receive digital account statements and payment receipts.  Where available, the apps will show a map depicting the location at which the transaction took place, along with the company's logo.

Issued Cards 
Zenus was granted Principal Membership by Visa in 2020 - a first of its kind partnership allowing the instant issuance of digital cross border Visa cards to clients around the world. The Zenus Visa Infinite physical card was rolled out in October 2022. The metal card offers instant access to a customer's US account in over 150 countries at local ATMs. Cardholders are also eligible for the travel, purchase and lifestyle benefits associated with the Infinite card offering from Visa. All customers in eligible countries signing up for an account are issued a Zenus Visa Infinite Card.

References 

Financial services companies of the United States